The Oliver Filley House is a historic Greek Revival house at 130 Mountain Avenue in Bloomfield, Connecticut, United States. It was occupied by Captain Oliver Filley and his family, a tinsmith  who served as a captain in the Connecticut militia during the War of 1812.

Oliver Filley Senior and Junior
Shortly after the end of the Revolutionary War, Oliver Filley Sr. purchased land and a house in Wintonbury.  He died at the age of 39 in 1796, leaving a part of the family farm to his 12-year-old son Oliver Jr. Filley received only nine acres at the time of his father's death, but would add to his holdings, and eventually built up the farm to include the original holdings. He started a tinsmith business in 1806, a year after marrying Annis Humphrey from nearby Simsbury. His business grew, and he expanded his operations with manufacturing and warehousing in Elizabethtown, New Jersey.

Filley operated out of the New Jersey location, until the War of 1812 forced him to return to Connecticut. The Federalists of New England were not in favor of the war; as a consequence, the Connecticut troops were not placed under federal control. Filley was appointed captain in 1812, and put in charge of forty militiamen, but he did not see any combat as the British did not reach this far north.

The House

Filley built the house for his son Jay in 1834. It is a stone building, built in a Greek Revival style. The walls are made of rubblestone and multi-colored traprock. The floor plan is unusual, consisting of two intersecting wings. The primary living quarters were in the west wing. Filley's decision to build a stone house was partly motivated by the desire of his son, but he was also aware that a stone house was becoming a status symbol in the area. It would become the third stone house in Bloomfield, following a house built two year earlier by David Grant, and one built a year earlier by Francis Gillette.

The house, which was added to the National Historic Register because of the work of Sharon Yusba Steinberg, is now owned by the town of Bloomfield, which is planning a restoration project.

See also
National Register of Historic Places listings in Hartford County, Connecticut

Notes

References
 

Houses on the National Register of Historic Places in Connecticut
Houses completed in 1834
Houses in Hartford County, Connecticut
Greek Revival houses in Connecticut
Bloomfield, Connecticut
National Register of Historic Places in Hartford County, Connecticut